Pauline McLynn (born 11 July 1962) is an Irish character actress and author. She is best known for her roles as Mrs Doyle in the Channel 4 sitcom Father Ted, Libby Croker in the Channel 4 comedy drama Shameless, Tip Haddem in the BBC One comedy Jam & Jerusalem, and Yvonne Cotton in the BBC soap opera EastEnders. McLynn also appeared as a policewoman in Sky One's Trollied.

Early life 
McLynn was born in Sligo, and grew up with two younger brothers in Galway. She studied History of Art and Modern English at Trinity College, Dublin, but was more heavily involved in the college's drama society. She graduated with an MA.

Career
Although McLynn was in her early thirties when playing Mrs Doyle in Father Ted, makeup was used to make her look far older to fit the character's elderly profile. She received a British Comedy Award for her performances in 1996. The award was presented to her by Tony Blair. 

Subsequent televised appearances included a similar elderly role in the "Yesterday Island" episode of youth sci-fi series Life Force, sketches on Bremner, Bird and Fortune, and panel shows Just a Minute, Have I Got News for You, and If I Ruled the World. In 1999, she appeared in the film adaptation of Angela's Ashes. She also appeared in Jennifer Saunders' Jam & Jerusalem. Between 2001 and 2003 she reprised Mrs Doyle in an advert for online tax return filing by the Inland Revenue.

McLynn was critically acclaimed for her performance in the 2005 film Gypo, receiving an Irish Film and Television Award nomination for Best Actress.

McLynn appeared in Shameless, which was produced by the British broadcaster Channel 4, as Libby Croker. In January 2011 it was announced that she had left the show, reportedly after a "difficult year".
McLynn also played the role of Alice's mother in the Comedy Central show Threesome. She starred in Samuel Beckett’s Happy Days at the Crucible Theatre, Sheffield in 2011.

McLynn played Mary Whyte in the BBC's 2013 sitcom Father Figure.

In 2014, McLynn played the part of Evelyn in "Kiss for the Camera", a series three episode of the BBC comedy Pramface. On 12 May 2014, McLynn joined the cast of EastEnders as Yvonne Cotton, the mother of Charlie Cotton (Declan Bennett) and ex-daughter-in-law of Dot Branning (June Brown). After starting as a recurring character, McLynn quickly became a regular when her character's storylines escalated. She made her final appearance on 13 January 2015, at the end of her contract. However, McLynn returned to the soap opera on 14 May 2015 for one single episode to give evidence against Dot during Nick Cotton's (John Altman) murder trial.

In 2017, McLynn appeared as the mother of lead character Marcella in Roisin Conaty's E4 comedy GameFace, and in April 2018 she portrayed Sister Mary in the BBC Two biopic Dave Allen At Peace. She appears as a minor character named Mrs. Trattner in the 2018 film Johnny English Strikes Again.

In 2020, McLynn was one of the celebrity pilgrims on the Sultans Trail in the BBC series Pilgrimage: Road to Istanbul. She also appeared in Riverdance: The Animated Adventure.

In 2021 McLynn appeared as Oona in the E4 S6 of Inside No. 9. She also appeared as Carol, a bar landlady, in the film Last Night in Soho, which was released in October 2021. McLynn also appeared in Doctor Who, as Mary in the New Year’s special "Eve of the Daleks".

Personal life 
McLynn is married to theatrical agent Richard Cook. She is a patron of the children's charity World Vision Ireland and is president of Friends of Innisfree Housing Association.
She is also a patron for Littlehill Animal Rescue, Sanctuary in Ireland and Birmingham Greyhound Protection.

McLynn is a fan of the Premier League football team Aston Villa. She says her best moment supporting Villa came in 1996 when she watched them beat Leeds United in the Football League Cup final with her Father Ted co-star Ardal O'Hanlon, who is a Leeds supporter. McLynn was raised as a Roman Catholic, but is now an atheist.

McLynn is involved with many charities against the racing and export of greyhounds. She is a patron of Birmingham Greyhound Protection.

Awards and nominations

References

External links 
 
 

1962 births
Father Ted
Irish humorists
20th-century Irish novelists
Irish atheists
Irish former Christians
Irish television actresses
Irish women novelists
Former Roman Catholics
Living people
The Panel (Irish TV series) presenters
People from Sligo (town)
Actresses from Galway (city)
21st-century Irish novelists
Women humorists
20th-century Irish women writers
21st-century Irish women writers
Alumni of Trinity College Dublin